Fabiano "Cyclone" Goncalves Aoki (born on 21 November 1978) is a Brazilian former heavyweight kickboxer, fighting out of TARGET team in Japan. He was J-Network tournament champion, RISE, WPMF, HEAT and WBC Muaythai champion, competed in the K-1 and is currently signed to GLORY.

Biography and career
He replaced Igor Jurković and challenged Christian Bosch for his WBC Muaythai heavyweight world title. Fight happened in Bangkok, Thailand at Singha Battle For The Belts event on 9 June 2012. Aoki dominated the fight and KOed Bosch in 2nd round via flying knee.

In 2012 he signed for GLORY and made his promotional debut in Brussels on 6 October 2012 at Glory 2: Brussels where he lost via unanimous decision to Filip Verlinden suffering a knockdown with a left hook in the second round.

He lost to Mourad Bouzidi via TKO due to corner stoppage in round two at Glory 6: Istanbul in Istanbul, Turkey on 6 April 2013.

Titles
 2012 WBC Muaythai Heavyweight World Champion
 2012 HEAT Kickboxing Heavyweight Champion
 2010 WPMF World Super-heavyweight Champion
 2008 RISE Heavyweight Champion
 2007 J-Network Heavyweight Tournament Champion

Kickboxing record

|-
|-  bgcolor="#FFBBBB"
| 2013-04-06 || Loss ||align=left| Mourad Bouzidi || Glory 6: Istanbul || Istanbul, Turkey || TKO (corner stoppage) || 2 || 
|-  bgcolor= "#FFBBBB"
| 2012-10-06 || Loss ||align=left| Filip Verlinden || Glory 2: Brussels || Brussels, Belgium || Decision (unanimous) || 3 || 3:00 
|-
|-  bgcolor="#CCFFCC"
| 2012-06-09 || Win ||align=left| Christian Bosch || Singha Battle For The Belts || Bangkok, Thailand || KO (jumping knee) || 2 ||2:28 
|-
! style=background:white colspan=9 |
|-
|-  bgcolor= "#CCFFCC"
| 2012-04-08 || Win ||align=left| Hiromi Amada || HEAT 22 || Japan || KO (knee) || 2 || 1:39
|-
! style=background:white colspan=9 |
|-
|-  bgcolor="#FFBBBB"
| 2011-11-23 || Loss ||align=left| Jan Soukup || RISE 85: RISE Heavyweight Tournament 2011, Quarter Finals || Tokyo, Japan || Decision (majority) || 3 || 3:00 
|-
|-  bgcolor= "#CCFFCC"
| 2011-07-23 || Win ||align=left| Joey Kaputai || RISE 80 || Tokyo, Japan || KO (right hook) || 1 ||
|-
|-  bgcolor= "#CCFFCC"
| 2011-04-29 || Win ||align=left| Prince Ali || J-Network Time to Change the Kick by J-Spirit 2nd|| Japan || TKO (foot injury) || 1 ||0:22
|-
|-  bgcolor= "#CCFFCC"
| 2010-12-30 || Win ||align=left| Andrew Peck || SRC - Soul of Fight || Tokyo, Japan || TKO (cut) || 2 || 
|-
|-  bgcolor= "#CCFFCC"
| 2010-09-12 || Win ||align=left| Gotoku Onda || M-1 Fairtex Muay Thai Challenge vol. 3|| Tokyo, Japan || KO (straight left) || 2 || 2:27
|-
|-  bgcolor= "#CCFFCC"
| 2010-03-21 || Win ||align=left| Yuki Niimura || M-1 Fairtex Muay Thai Challenge vol. 1|| Tokyo, Japan || Decision (unanimous) || 5 || 3:00
|-
! style=background:white colspan=9 |
|-
|-  bgcolor= "#CCFFCC"
| 2009-09-13 || Win ||align=left| Bank Fairtex || M-1 Fairtex Muay Thai Challenge vol. 3|| Tokyo, Japan || Decision (majority) || 3 || 3:00
|-
|-  bgcolor= "#CCFFCC"
| 2008-11-30 || Win ||align=left| Singh Jaideep || R.I.S.E. 51 || Japan || Ext R. Decision (Unanimous) || 4 || 3:00
|-
|-  bgcolor= "#CCFFCC"
| 2008-07-04 || Win ||align=left| Magnum Sakai || R.I.S.E. 48 - The King of Gladiators || Japan || TKO (3 knockdowns) || 2 || 2:31
|-
! style=background:white colspan=9 |
|-
|-  bgcolor= "#CCFFCC"
| 2008-05-11 || Win ||align=left| Moriguchi Dragon || Rise 46 - The King of Gladiators || Japan || Decision (unanimous) || 3 || 3:00
|-
|-  bgcolor="#FFBBBB"
| 2008-04-11 || Loss ||align=left| Singh Jaideep || J-Network  "Let's Kick with J the 2nd" || Japan || Decision (Unanimous) || 5 || 3:00
|-
! style=background:white colspan=9 |
|-
|-  bgcolor= "#CCFFCC"
| 2007-12-16 || Win ||align=left| Singh Jaideep || R.I.S.E. Dead or Alive tournament 07 || Japan || KO (Right hook) || 1 || 2:45
|-  bgcolor="#CCFFCC"
| 2007-09-26 || Win ||align=left| Koichi Pettas || J-Network Tour Championship of J 2nd || Tokyo, Japan || Ext R. Decision (unanimous) || 4 || 3:00 
|-
! style=background:white colspan=9 |
|-
|-  bgcolor="#CCFFCC"
| 2007-09-26 || Win ||align=left| Yuzo Matsumoto  ||J-Network Championship Tour of J 2nd || Tokyo, Japan || Decision (unanimous) || 3 || 3:00 
|-
|-  bgcolor="#CCFFCC"
| 2007-08-03 || Win ||align=left| Takashi Noboru  ||J-Network Championship Tour of J 1st || Tokyo, Japan || Decision (unanimous) || 3 || 3:00 
|-
|-  bgcolor="#CCFFCC"
| 2006-05-28 || Win ||align=left| Yoichi Uchida  ||R.I.S.E. XXVI || Tokyo, Japan || Decision (unanimous) || 3 || 3:00 
|-
|-  bgcolor="#FFBBBB"
| 2006-03-26 || Loss ||align=left| Koichi Pettas || RISE G-Bazooka Tournament '06, quarter finals || Tokyo, Japan || KO (Left hook) || 1 || 2:04
|-
|-  bgcolor="#FFBBBB"
| 2005-06-19 || Loss ||align=left| Magnum Sakai  ||R.I.S.E. G-Bazooka Tournament '05, semi finals|| Japan || Decision (split) || 3 || 3:00 
|-
|-  bgcolor="#CCFFCC"
| 2005-06-19 || Win ||align=left| Junichi Sawayashiki  ||R.I.S.E. G-Bazooka Tournament '05, quarter finals|| Japan || Decision (unanimous) || 3 || 3:00 
|-
|-  bgcolor="#CCFFCC"
| 2005-04-24 || Win ||align=left| Masanobu Yamanaka  ||R.I.S.E. XIV|| Japan || Decision (unanimous) || 3 || 3:00 
|-
|-  bgcolor="#FFBBBB"
| 2005-02-20 || Loss ||align=left| Tomokazu Kamiya  ||R.I.S.E. XIII|| Japan || Decision (majority) || 3 || 3:00 
|-
|-  bgcolor="#CCFFCC"
| 2004-12-19 || Win ||align=left| Serada Takanori  || R.I.S.E. DEAD or ALIVE Tournament '04|| Japan || TKO (arm injury) || 2 || 2:05 
|-
|-  bgcolor="#FFBBBB"
| 2004-07-04 || Loss ||align=left| Aoyagi Masahide  ||R.I.S.E. The Law of The Ring|| Japan || TKO (3 knockdowns/low kick) || 3 || 1:35
|-
|-  bgcolor="#CCFFCC"
| 2004-04-29 || Win ||align=left| Taichi Furuta  || R.I.S.E. VII|| Japan || KO (right uppercut) || 2 || 2:51 
|-
|-  bgcolor="#CCFFCC"
| 2004-03-27 || Win ||align=left| Hiroshi Tajima || K-1 World Grand Prix 2004 in Saitama || Saitama, Japan || Decision (majority) || 3 || 3:00 
|-
|-  bgcolor="#FFBBBB"
| 2004-02-15 || Loss ||align=left| Great Kusatsu || K-1 Burning 2004 || Okinawa, Japan || KO (kick) || 1 || 2:53
|-
|-  bgcolor="#CCFFCC"
| 2003-11-16 || Win ||align=left| Manabu Ito || IKUSA Young Gunners 2 || Japan || Decision (split) || 3 || 3:00 
|-
|-  bgcolor="#CCFFCC"
| 2003-08-30 || Win ||align=left| Atsushi Sato || IKUSA Futur Fighter IKUSA 4 || Japan || Decision (unanimous) || 3 || 3:00 
|-
|-  bgcolor="#FFBBBB"
| 2003-08-23 || Loss ||align=left| Riyu || Taekwondo Game 2003 Grand Prix || Japan || Points || 3 || 2:00
|-
|-  bgcolor="#CCFFCC"
| 2003-04-27 || Win ||align=left| Stewart Fulton || R.I.S.E. || Japan || TKO (3 knockdowns) || 1 || 1:57
|-
|-  bgcolor="#CCFFCC"
| 2003-02-23 || Win ||align=left| Ishikura Ken || R.I.S.E. || Japan || KO (knee) || 1 || 1:25
|-
|-
| colspan=9 | Legend:

Mixed martial arts record

|-
|Loss
|align=center| 0–1 (1)
|Yuji Sakuragi
| TKO (knee injury)
| MARS 6 - Rapid Fire
| 
|align=center|2
|align=center|1:55
|Yokohama, Japan
|
|-
|NC
|align=center| 0–0 (1)
|Yuji Sakuragi
| NC (groin kick)
| MARS 5 - Marching On
| 
|align=center|1
|align=center|0:17
|Tokyo, Japan
|MMA debut.

See also
List of male kickboxers

References

External links
 Profile at gloryworldseries.com
 Profile at k-1sport.de
 

1978 births
Living people
Brazilian male kickboxers
Brazilian male mixed martial artists
Mixed martial artists utilizing Shotokan
Mixed martial artists utilizing Kyokushin kaikan
Brazilian male karateka
Brazilian people of Japanese descent
Brazilian expatriate sportspeople in Japan
Heavyweight kickboxers